The following events occurred in November 1925:

November 1, 1925 (Sunday)
17 were killed in a mine explosion near Gelsenkirchen, Germany.
The Buster Keaton film Go West opened.
Died: Lester Cuneo, 37, American actor (suicide)

November 2, 1925 (Monday)
In Australia, 100 police clashed with 1,000 striking seamen on the wharf in Fremantle as the officers tried to board a ship that the strikers were trying to damage; many were injured and 100 arrests were made.
The unidentified body of a young soldier was interred in the Tomb of the Unknown Soldier in Warsaw, Poland.
The operetta Princess Flavia opened on Broadway.

November 3, 1925 (Tuesday)
Alfred Hitchcock's directorial debut film, The Pleasure Garden, was released.
Twenty-one-year-old film actress Constance Bennett married millionaire socialite Philip Morgan Plant in a hotel lobby in Greenwich, Connecticut; she did not make another film until they divorced in 1929.
Died: Lucile McVey, 34 or 35, American actress, part of the husband-and-wife comedy team Mr. & Mrs. Sidney Drew

November 4, 1925 (Wednesday)
Italian Socialist deputy and expert marksman Tito Zaniboni took a hotel room opposite the Palazzo Chigi with the intent of shooting Benito Mussolini with a telescopic rifle when he came out to the balcony to make a speech. Police had been tipped off by an intercepted phone call and stopped the would-be assassin.
the Reform Party led by incumbent Prime Minister Gordon Coates won the New Zealand general election.
Born: Doris Roberts, actress, in St. Louis, Missouri (d. 2016)

November 5, 1925 (Thursday)
The hit war film The Big Parade opened.
Died: Secret agent Sidney Reilly is executed by the OGPU, the secret police of the Soviet Union.

November 6, 1925 (Friday)
Kliment Voroshilov was appointed as Soviet Union Commisar for Military and Naval Affairs following the death of Mikhail Frunze.
The Dow Jones Industrial Average closed at 159.39. This was the 65th record close of the calendar year 1925, a record in itself almost doubling the old mark of 34 set in 1899. The record stood until 1995.
Died: Khải Định, 40, Emperor of Vietnam

November 7, 1925 (Saturday)
Pittsburgh was granted a franchise by the National Hockey League. The club was named the Pirates, after the baseball team also based in the city.
Several Italian opposition leaders were arrested in connection with the assassination attempt on Benito Mussolini.
It was announced that the remains of Manfred von Richthofen, "The Red Baron", would be disinterred from France and repatriated to Germany.

November 8, 1925 (Sunday)
The film The Eagle, starring Rudolph Valentino, was released.
Parliamentary elections were held in Portugal. The Democratic Party won a majority with 83 of the 163 seats.
Died: Domício da Gama, 62, Brazilian journalist and diplomat

November 9, 1925 (Monday)
Forces allied with Wu Peifu inflicted a defeat on Zhang Zuolin after several days of fighting south of Xuzhou.
The Leonard "Kip" Rhinelander divorce trial opened in White Plains, New York. Rhinelander was seeking an annulment of the marriage on the grounds that his wife Alice had failed to inform him of her "colored" blood before the wedding. The trial was a significant media circus event at the time.
The race film Body and Soul was released, directed by Oscar Micheaux and starring Paul Robeson in his film debut.

November 10, 1925 (Tuesday)
The Archbishop of Canterbury appointed a committee of six doctors and six clergymen to investigate the veracity of faith healing.
Born: Richard Burton, actor, in Pontrhydyfen, Wales (d. 1984)

November 11, 1925 (Wednesday)
Howard Carter and an autopsy team began the unwrapping of the mummy of Pharaoh Tutankhamun. The process was exceedingly difficult due to the extreme fragility of the bandages and a resinous coating that held the mummy fast inside the sarcophagus. 
Le Faisceau, a French Fascist party, was founded, consisting of about 10,000 members.
Born: Jonathan Winters, comedic actor, in Bellbrook, Ohio (d. 2013)

November 12, 1925 (Thursday)
Louis Armstrong and His Hot Five recorded their first songs together for Okeh Records. These recordings were among the most important and influential to the development of jazz music.
The British submarine  sank with all 69 hands in the English Channel when it was hit by the Swedish ship SS Vidar.
The Italian government agreed to repay its war debt to the United States with a fixed interest rate of 0.4 percent.

November 13, 1925 (Friday)
The Polish Cabinet of Władysław Grabski resigned over the difference of opinion with the banks over how to stabilize the zloty.

November 14, 1925 (Saturday)
The Nationalist Party of Australia won the Australian federal election winning 37 of 75 seats, despite losing the popular vote. This was the first Australian federal election to have compulsory voting.
The first Surrealist art exhibition opened in Paris.

November 15, 1925 (Sunday)
The Republican Party of Agricultural and Smallholder People won parliamentary elections in Czechoslovakia.
About 2,000 German Fascist followers of Erich Ludendorff gathered in front of the Berlin City Palace to protest the Locarno Treaties. 
The Cecil B. DeMille-directed film The Road to Yesterday was released.

November 16, 1925 (Monday)
The films The Red Kimona and Stage Struck were released.

November 17, 1925 (Tuesday)
The New Zealand and South Seas International Exhibition opened in Dunedin, New Zealand.
A general election was held in Burma. The People's Party received the most votes, but was unable to form a government.
Born: Elizabeth Connell, physician, in Springfield, Massachusetts (d. 2018); Rock Hudson, actor, in Winnetka, Illinois (d. 1985)

November 18, 1925 (Wednesday)
The British House of Commons ratified the Locarno Treaties by a vote of 375 to 13.
Born: Gene Mauch, baseball player and manager, in Salina, Kansas (d. 2005)

November 19, 1925 (Thursday)
President Coolidge called for the United States to join the World Court in an address to the New York State Chamber of Commerce.
The autopsy of Tutankhamun concluded. The bad condition of the body and limited forensic science of the 1920s meant that little could be determined other than the age of the body being estimated to be about eighteen.

November 20, 1925 (Friday)
Aleksander Skrzyński became Prime Minister of Poland.
A state funeral was held for Manfred von Richthofen as his repatriated remains were buried in the Invalidenfriedhof in Berlin. President Paul von Hindenburg led the proceedings.
Born: Kaye Ballard, actress, comedian and singer, in Cleveland, Ohio; Robert F. Kennedy, politician, in Brookline, Massachusetts (d. 1968); Mark Miller, actor, in Houston, Texas
Died: Alexandra of Denmark, 80, Queen consort of the United Kingdom as spouse of Edward VII
Zomersky died on 20 November 1925 in Warsaw.

November 21, 1925 (Saturday)
Lava Beds National Monument was established as a United States National Monument.

November 22, 1925 (Sunday)
Paul Painlevé resigned as Prime Minister of France when a credit moratorium article in his financial plan was defeated in the Chamber of Deputies by three votes.
The forces of Guo Songling began to lay siege to Mukden, the capital of Zhang Zuolin.

November 23, 1925 (Monday)
The most notorious episode in the Kip Rhinelander divorce trial unfolded when Mrs. Rhinelander was taken to the jury room and compelled to partially disrobe in front of the jury to establish that she was indeed "colored" and that Mr. Rhinelander had to have been aware that she was not white.
Born: Maria di Gerlando, operatic soprano singer, in Luzerne County, Pennsylvania (d. 2010)

November 24, 1925 (Tuesday)
The Forrest Theatre (now the Eugene O'Neill Theatre) opened on Broadway.
The Princess Theatre (now The Regal Theatre) opened in Kensington Park, South Australia.
Born: William F. Buckley, Jr., conservative author and commentator, in New York City (d. 2008); Simon van der Meer, physicist and Nobel Prize laureate, in The Hague, Netherlands (d. 2011)

November 25, 1925 (Wednesday)
The film The Phantom of the Opera starring Lon Chaney was released.
Prajadhipok took the throne of Siam upon the death of his brother Vajiravudh.
Died: Vajiravudh, 45, monarch of Siam, at the Grand Palace in Phra Nakhon

November 26, 1925 (Thursday)
Italy promulgated a bill bringing secret societies such as Freemasonry under control of the state and forbidding government employees from belonging to them.
It was reported that the British government had advised Benito Mussolini not to attend the formal signing of the Locarno Treaties in London, as it could not protect him from being insulted in public. The British public was generally displeased by Mussolini's increasingly authoritarian rule, and labor factions were particularly angered over his suppression of Italian trade unions. Diplomat Vittorio Scialoja would be sent as the Italian representative instead.
Born: Eugene Istomin, pianist, in New York City (d. 2003)

November 27, 1925 (Friday)
A state funeral was held at Westminster Abbey in London for Queen mother Alexandra. The kings of England, Denmark, Norway and Belgium marched behind the casket in the procession.
Feng Yuxiang sent a public message to Zhang Zuolin telling him to retire or else he would be attacked.
The jury in the Ossian Sweet trial said it was unable to reach a verdict after 46 hours of deliberation. The judge declared a mistrial and dismissed the jury.
Miriam Noel Wright, wife of architect Frank Lloyd Wright, filed for divorce, alleging desertion and cruelty. It had not previously been known to the public that they were married.
The Reichstag approved the Locarno Treaties.
Born: John Maddox, science writer, in Penllergaer, Wales (d. 2009); Ernie Wise, comedian, in Bramley, Leeds, England (d. 1999)

November 28, 1925 (Saturday)
The government of French Prime Minister Paul Painlevé fell over the failure of Finance Minister Joseph Caillaux to reach a settlement with the United States over French wartime loans.
The Grand Ole Opry was first broadcast, as a one-hour radio "barn dance" on WSM in Nashville, Tennessee.
Queen mother Alexandra was buried in St. George's Chapel, Windsor Castle alongside her late husband in a simple ceremony.
In American football, the Army–Navy Game was won by Army, 10 to 3, at the Polo Grounds in New York.

November 29, 1925 (Sunday)
Parliamentary elections were held in Uruguay. The National Party won the most seats of any one party, but various factions of the Colorado Party formed a majority.
The comedy film Clothes Make the Pirate starring Leon Errol and Dorothy Gish was released.

November 30, 1925 (Monday)
The Australian seamen's strike ended after fifteen weeks when Melbourne, the last port to hold out, capitulated.
Religious convents and dervish lodges were closed in Turkey.
A tropical storm struck near Tampa, Florida, becoming the latest hurricane to ever make landfall in the United States.
The film Cobra, starring Rudolph Valentino and Nita Naldi, opened.
Born: William H. Gates, Sr., attorney and father of Bill Gates, in Bremerton, Washington (d. 2020)

References

1925
1925-11
1925-11